Kalanchoe fedtschenkoi, formerly known as Bryophyllum fedtschenkoi, native to Madagascar, is widely sold as a house or garden plant that has established itself in the wild in some southern parts of the United States of America.
Its specific epithet fedtschenkoi honors botanist Boris Fedtschenko (1873-1947).

Description
Kalanchoe fedtschenkoi is a low-growing, frost-tender perennial succulent which prefers dry, open ground. It grows to 10–12 inches (25–30 cm) tall as an untidy, low, rounded herb. The stems are round, smooth and lax with visible leaf scars, often bending and touching the ground where they produce roots and new plants. Leaves are fleshy, alternate, blue-green and oval or obovate with fine scalloped edges, the edges may turn pink or red under strong sunlight or drought conditions. The tubular flowers are in corymbs, often multi-layered in good conditions. Each flower has a short calyx edged with delta-shaped segments, which is shorter than its tubular corolla. The corolla is an orange/coral/apricot color. The flowers are pendant.
 
Commonly called ‘Lavender Scallops’ from the shape and color of its leaves. It has few pests but may harbor mealy bugs or occasionally scale insects.

References

fedtschenkoi
fedtschenkoi
Endemic flora of Madagascar
Taxa named by Joseph Marie Henry Alfred Perrier de la Bâthie